Live in the Real World is the first live CD and DVD album by Dutch/Mexican progressive metal band Stream of Passion, created by Arjen Anthony Lucassen.

It features not only songs from their debut album Embrace the Storm, but also songs from Ayreon, Ambeon and Star One, three other musical projects by Lucassen.

Track listing

Disc one 
 "Intro" - 1:28
 "Spellbound" - 4:17
 "Passion" - 5:40
 "Waracle" - 6:16
 "Wherever You Are" - 5:33
 "Computer Eyes" - 6:18
 "Calliopeia" - 5:21
 "Valley of the Queens" - 4:18
 "Haunted" - 4:58
 "The Charm of the Seer" - 3:11
 "Deceiver/Songs of the Ocean" - 6:11

Disc two 
 "Day One: Vigil" - 2:02
 "Day Three: Pain" - 5:57
 "Nostalgia" - 3:44
 "Out in the Real World" - 6:31
 "The Castle Hall" - 6:28
 "Into the Black Hole/Cold Metal" - 8:32
 "When the Levee Breaks" - 6:07
 "Day Eleven: Love" - 6:18

Bonus features of the DVD 
Behind the Scenes
Photo Gallery
Video Clip: Out in the Real World
Making of the Video Clip
Tour Diary

Personnel 
 Marcela Bovio - lead vocals, violin
 Arjen Anthony Lucassen - lead/rhythm guitar, backing vocals
 Lori Linstruth  - lead/rhythm guitar
 Johan van Stratum - bass
 Alejandro Millán  - keyboard, piano, backing vocals
 Davy Mickers - drums
 Diana Bovio - backing vocals
 Damian Wilson - guest Vocals

Stream of Passion albums
2006 live albums
Inside Out Music live albums
Inside Out Music video albums